Coiled-coil-helix-coiled-coil-helix domain containing 2 is a protein that in humans is encoded by the CHCHD2 gene.

Function

The protein encoded by this gene belongs to a class of eukaryotic CX(9)C proteins characterized by four cysteine residues spaced ten amino acids apart from one another. These residues form disulfide linkages that define a CHCH fold. In response to stress, the protein translocates from the mitochondrial intermembrane space to the nucleus where it binds to a highly conserved 13 nucleotide oxygen responsive element in the promoter of cytochrome oxidase 4I2, a subunit of the terminal enzyme of the electron transport chain.

In concert with recombination signal sequence-binding protein J, binding of this protein activates the oxygen responsive element at four percent oxygen. In addition, it has been shown that this protein is a negative regulator of mitochondria-mediated apoptosis. In response to apoptotic stimuli, mitochondrial levels of this protein decrease, allowing BCL2-associated X protein to oligomerize and activate the Caspase Cascade. Pseudogenes of this gene are found on multiple chromosomes. Alternative splicing results in multiple transcript variants. [provided by RefSeq, Feb 2016].

References

Further reading